Cephalenicodes bimaculatus is a species of beetle in the family Cerambycidae, and the only species in the genus Cephalenicodes. It was described by Fauvel in 1906.

References

Enicodini
Beetles described in 1906